Hurricane Cora was the first tropical cyclone of the 1978 Atlantic hurricane season to reach hurricane strength. Forming from a disturbance that exited the African coast on August 7, the storm moved at an unusually high forward speed for a cyclone in the Atlantic Ocean in August. The storm later reached hurricane strength and formed a well-defined eye that lasted only 12 hours before the eye rapidly lost organization for unknown reasons, though the post-season report on the storm mentions the possibility that its high speed caused the eye to dissipate. The storm moved west-southwestward, weakening before making landfall on the island of Grenada. The storm lost its circulation and became a tropical wave on August 12. The remnant crossed over Central America into the Pacific Ocean, where it reintensified, becoming Hurricane Kristy.

Cora was an unusual cyclone, maintaining an unusually low latitude for the Atlantic in August at high speeds, similar to the tracks of Tropical Storm Alma in 1974 and Tropical Storm Fran in 1990. The hurricane was also upgraded into a hurricane based solely on satellite photography, the second time this occurred. Although it passed through the Windward Islands and the Lesser Antilles, only minor effects were reported. Cora was also responsible for altering weather conditions allowing for a takeoff of the historical flight of the Double Eagle II hot air balloon.

Meteorological history

In early August, a disturbance was observed in satellite images moving off the coast of Africa on August 4. The separated mass began rapidly organizing, becoming Tropical Depression Three late on August 7. The tropical depression continued to gain organization and was upgraded to a tropical storm on August 8, receiving the name Cora.

The newly named tropical storm continued to grow, reaching hurricane strength later that day after developing a well-defined eye, peaking early on August 9 with  winds, a minimum pressure of 980 mbar, and gale–force winds extending  from the center. The hurricane would continue in this direction throughout its lifespan. Only 12 hours after forming, the eye rapidly dissipated on satellite imagery for unknown reasons, although the hurricane's high forward speed may have played a part. After becoming disorganized, a Hurricane Hunter aircraft—the first one to fly in the storm—reported that the cyclone had winds of only , the highest winds recorded in the storm. After the report, Cora was downgraded into a tropical storm early on August 10. The dissipating storm continued on, striking the island of Grenada on August 11 as it weakened into a tropical depression. On August 12, the depression weakened into a tropical wave near Aruba due to continental influence despite atmospheric conditions being favorable for development. The wave was notable in that it was almost completely devoid of any cloudiness or convection. The remnants of Cora crossed Central America and uneventfully continued westward until August 18, when its remains contributed to the formation of Hurricane Kristy.

Impact, records, and naming

Rain was also reported, but totals were not large due to the storm's quick passage. One death was attributed to Cora on St. Lucia when a 22–year old stepped on a high tension power line that was downed by the winds from the storm in Castries. In addition, an industry on the island reported tree losses of two to four percent from the storm. No reports of damage were received from the other Windward Islands and damage on Grenada, if any, is unknown. Although it remained far to the south, Hurricane Cora affected weather conditions that reached as far north as Presque Isle, Maine,  where balloonists Ben Abruzzo, Maxie Anderson, and Larry Newman were preparing to make the first ever transatlantic balloon flight on the Double Eagle II. The winds created by Cora's influence would give the hot air balloon the northerly push required for takeoff according to Anderson. After six days, the Double Eagle II completed the flight, landing near Miserey, France. Cora also affected another record attempt when swimmer Diana Nyad was delayed due to the hurricane's influence. The record attempt ultimately failed after 42 hours.

According to the preliminary report on the hurricane, neither track forecasts or intensity forecasts panned out for the storm. The track forecasts called for a path more northward than the actual track whereas following the development of the eye, intensity forecasts called for further strengthening until it became clear the cyclone was weakening. When it was upgraded to a hurricane on August 8, Cora became the second hurricane to have been upgraded to that intensity based solely on satellite presentation after 1975's Hurricane Doris. The hurricane was also the second of three storms in the season to reform or be reclassified as East Pacific storms. The other two were Tropical Storm Bess (which became Hurricane Iva), and Hurricane Greta-Olivia. Of these, only Greta maintained its circulation over land. This was the only time an Atlantic hurricane was named Cora.

See also

Hurricane Joyce (2000)
Other storms of the same name

References

Cora
Category 1 Atlantic hurricanes
1978 Atlantic hurricane season
1978 meteorology